The ice dance competition of the 2014 Winter Olympics was held at the Iceberg Skating Palace in Sochi, Russia. The short dance was held on 16 February and the free dance on 17 February. The competition was won by Meryl Davis and Charlie White from the United States. This was the first time the U.S. had won a gold medal in ice dance.

Records
For complete list of figure skating records, see list of highest scores in figure skating.

Prior to the competition, the existing ISU highest scores were:

The following new best scores were set during this competition:

Schedule
All dates and times are (UTC+4).

Results

Short dance
The short dance was held on 16 February.

Free dance
The free dance was held on 17 February.

Overall
Teams were ranked according to their overall score.

References

External links
 Sochi 2014 Figure Skating – Ice Dance page 
 Sochi 2014 Figure Skating Results Book
 2014 Winter Olympics page at the International Skating Union
 

Ice Dance
2014
Mixed events at the 2014 Winter Olympics
2014 in figure skating